The 1924 Giro d'Italia was the 12th edition of the Giro d'Italia, a Grand Tour organized and sponsored by the newspaper La Gazzetta dello Sport. The race was won by the Italian rider Giuseppe Enrici. Second and third respectively were the Italian riders Federico Gay and Angiolo Gabrielli.

The 'start list' was reduced because of a strike, so the organiser Gazzetta dello Sport allowed independent riders to enter without support teams, as they provided bed, board and massage.  The event was unique because of the participation of Alfonsina Strada, the only female competitor in the history of the Giro. Entry number 72 was granted to Alfonsin Strada to conceal her gender. She successfully completed the first 7 stages but a series of crashes and punctures between L'Aquila and Perugia led to her exclusion (such was her heroism that the organisers allowed her to continue each stage without inclusion in the overall classification). Her final time was 20 hours behind of the first classified in Milan.

Participants

The peloton was completely composed of Italians for the second consecutive year. Notable riders that started the race included Giuseppe Enrici, Federico Gay and Bartolomeo Aymo. Former winners Costante Girardengo and Giovanni Brunero, along with Ottavio Bottecchia, Gaetano Belloni, and other top riders chose not participate in the race due to disagreements over appearance fees with the organizers. In order to get the appropriate number of riders, the organizers offered room and board, along with food, for all those who entered. The riders were all considered to be independent as many riders were in disagreement with their teams over money. Of the 90 riders that began the Giro d'Italia on 10 May, 30 of them made it to the finish in Milan on 1 June.

The 1924 edition of the race saw the first and only ever woman participate. Alfonsina Strada entered the race as "Alfonsin Strada" to conceal her gender. She previously raced against men in the Giro di Lombardia in 1917 and 1918. She was widely regarded as the best female cyclist in Italy at the time. Her identity was uncovered and made public by La Gazzetta dello Sport on 14 May when they published the headline "Alfonsina e la bici." Strada completed the first seven stages, but finished outside the time limit on the eighth stage where she fell several times and arrived in Perugia fifteen hours after starting. The organizers, however, asked her to continue riding to the race's finish because of the heightened interest in the race due to a woman participating in a men's event.

Final standings

Stage results

General classification

There were 30 cyclists who had completed all twelve stages. For these cyclists, the times they had needed in each stage was added up for the general classification. The cyclist with the least accumulated time was the winner. Angiolo Gabrielli won the prize for best ranked independent rider in the general classification.

Aftermath

Enrici became the first foreign born winner of the Giro d'Italia. Although he maintained Italian citizenship, Enrici was born in Pittsburgh, Pennsylvania in the United States.

References

Notes

Citations

1924
Giro d'Italia
Giro d'Italia
Giro d'Italia
Giro d'Italia